Soloalbum is a 2003 German comedy film based on the eponymous novel by Benjamin von Stuckrad-Barre.

Cast 
 Matthias Schweighöfer – Ben
 Nora Tschirner – Katharina
 Oliver Wnuk – Alf 
  – Christian
 Lisa Maria Potthoff – Nadja
 Leander Haußmann – Chefredakteur
  – Klaus
 Sandy Mölling – Anastacia
 Thomas D – Thomas D
 Julia Dietze – Franziska
  – Madonna
  – Frederick Unger

References

External links 

2003 films
2003 comedy films
German comedy films
2000s German-language films
Films based on German novels
2000s German films